Viraat (born Naveen Kumar, 14 November 1989) is an Indian actor, VFX artist, dancer and singer, who predominantly works in both the Kannada and Tamil industries. He is best known for playing the lead roles as Bhuvan in Subhavivaha,  Viraat Yaaji in Niharika, Prithvi in Perazhagi and Varun Krishna in Anbe Vaa He ranked 13th position in 2020  and 10th position in 2019, on The Chennai Times most desirable men on TV.

Career 

He started his career in 2006, with his debut in the Kannada film "Black" as a supporting role. His first movie in a leading role was in "10th Class A Section" (2009). After this, he followed up with some films in both lead and supporting roles. And also worked as playback singer for some Kannada movies. He is  a VFX artist who edited motion posters for a few Kannada movies. He is credited to have been the one who introduced motion posters phenomena in Kannada film industry. In 2014,  He acted in and edited "Ashtralle Just Missoo", a zero budget movie, which was received with good reviews. He edited, acted as lead in the movie about a delinquent young man, who falls into wrong path, then recovers from it and leads a good life . In the same year, he made his debut in Kannada Television Industry through a Kannada serial, Shubhavivaha, where he replaced as Bhuvan in Episode 28, a lead role opposite actress Kaavya Shastry. His next serial was in 2016, Niharika in Star Suvarna with Tejaswini Prakash, a negative lead role named as Viraat Yaaji.
In 2018, he entered the Tamil television industry by playing a lead role, as Prithvi, in the serial Perazhagi opposite Gayathri Raj. at present he is featuring in Anbe Vaa for Sun TV, opposite Actress/classical Dancer Delna Davis, as male lead Varun

Filmography

Films

Other Works

Television

Serials

Shows

Other Works

Awards

References 

Indian actors
Indian dancers
Indian singers
1989 births
Living people